Pascal Poisson (born 29 June 1958 in Plancoët) is a French former professional road bicycle racer. He competed in the team pursuit event at the 1980 Summer Olympics. He spent ten years as a professional, retiring in 1990. After retiring he moved to Guadeloupe.

Major results

1981
 1st Boucles des Flandres
 1st Prologue Tour de l'Avenir
 2nd Grand Prix La Marseillaise
 7th Overall Four Days of Dunkirk
1982
 2nd Overall Tour de Corse
 3rd Bordeaux–Paris
 3rd National Cyclo-cross Championships
 5th  Overall Tour de l'Aude
1983
 1st Stage 15a Vuelta a España
 1st Stage 1 Tour du Vaucluse
 2nd Critérium des As
 3rd Six Days of Grenoble (with Ralf Hofeditz)
 8th Overall Tour of the Americas
1984
 1st GP de Mauléon Moulins
 1st Stage 12 Tour de France
 3rd Overall Tour de l'Aude
 6th Bordeaux–Paris
1985
 4th Bordeaux–Paris
 10th La Flèche Wallonne
1987
 1st Grand Prix de Wallonie
1988
 1st Overall Four Days of Dunkirk
1st Stage 3
 1st Grand Prix de Denain
 3rd Critérium des As
1989
 1st Stage 1 Critérium du Dauphiné Libéré
 4th Overall Circuit Cycliste Sarthe
 7th GP Ouest–France
1990
 1st Stage 6 Tour de Trump
 4th GP de la Ville de Rennes
 6th Overall Circuit Cycliste Sarthe

Grand Tour general classification results timeline

References

External links 

1958 births
Living people
French male cyclists
French Tour de France stage winners
French Vuelta a España stage winners
Cyclists at the 1980 Summer Olympics
Olympic cyclists of France
Sportspeople from Côtes-d'Armor
French track cyclists
Cyclists from Brittany
21st-century French people
20th-century French people